Pedicia autumnalis is a species of hairy-eyed crane fly in the family Pediciidae.

References

Pediciidae
Articles created by Qbugbot
Insects described in 1917